The LPGA State Farm Classic was a women's professional golf tournament on the LPGA Tour. It was played annually from 1976 to 2011 in the Springfield, Illinois metropolitan area. From 1976 through 2006, the tournament was held at The Rail Golf Course. In 2007 it moved to Panther Creek Country Club.

Originally known as the Jerry Lewis Muscular Dystrophy Golf Classic, the tournament was underwritten solely by the owners of The Rail Golf Course for its first two years. A community-based not-for-profit organization took over the tournament in 1978. State Farm Insurance became the title sponsor in 1993. From 1980 until cancellation in 2011, over $2.5 million was contributed from tournament proceeds to medical and children's charities.

On December 9, 2011, it was announced  the tournament was being cancelled due to organizers failing to find a new sponsor. It had been announced earlier in the year that State Farm would be dropping its sponsorship after 2011.  

Tournament names through the years:
1976: Jerry Lewis Muscular Dystrophy Classic
1977: Rail Muscular Dystrophy Classic
1978–1992: Rail Charity (Golf) Classic
1993–2000: State Farm Rail Classic
2001–2006: State Farm Classic
2007–2011: LPGA State Farm Classic

Winners

* Championship won in sudden-death playoff.

1976 and 1981–2000 — 54-hole tournament
1977–1980 and 2001–2011 — 72-hole tournament, although the tournament in 2003 was shortened to 54 holes due to rain.

Tournament records

References

External links
Official website
Coverage on LPGA Tour's official website
Tournament results at Golfobserver.com
Panther Creek Country Club

Former LPGA Tour events
Golf in Illinois
Sports in Springfield, Illinois
State Farm
Recurring sporting events established in 1976
Recurring sporting events disestablished in 2011
1976 establishments in Illinois
2011 disestablishments in Illinois
Jerry Lewis
History of women in Illinois